Tracy Robinson may refer to:

Business
Tracy A. Robinson - CEO of Canadian National Railway

Academia
Tracy S. Robinson - attorney and senior lecturer at the University of the West Indies